The Discovery 20 is a 1980s era trimaran sailboat design by Chris White.

The Discovery 20 was featured in the Small Trimarans book.

See also
List of multihulls
Chris White
Trimaran

External links
Discovery 20: Chris White Design
Discovery 20: Chris White Design, PinoyBoats forum discussion
Construction plans part #1 and construction plans part #2.

References

Trimarans